Wish upon a Pike, also known as The Magic Fish, is a 1938 fantasy film directed by Alexander Rowe, which was his debut and filmed at Soyuzdetfilm. It is adapted from a play by Yelizaveta Tarakhovskaya, itself based on At the Pike's Behest and other tales from Slavic folklore. At the time it was made, it was seen as controversial in the Soviet Union to direct films based on fairy tales due to government censorship.

The film tells the story of Yemelya the fool who catches a magical pike that grants him wishes in exchange for its life.

Plot
In the dead of winter, the poor farmer's son Yemelya is not able to cut wood and then drive back home to his mother's hut because the last horse was taken from him by the Tsar. Thus he goes to get some water and ends up catching a magical pike, but decides to spare its life. Out of gratitude, the magic fish promises him that all his wishes should come true.

Meanwhile, the Tsar sends his heralds in all four directions to find a man who can make his always ill-tempered princess laugh; he announces that to this man he would give her in marriage. One of the heralds sees Yemelya and observes him as he wishes that the wood-laden sled would be able to drive home without a pulling horse. He demands that Yemelya accompany him to the Tsar, but the latter refuses – the Tsar should come to him instead.

At the Tsar's court, none of the suitors have managed to make the princess laugh, the herald returns and tells his master about the miracle he saw. Immediately, the Tsar sends his general and some soldiers to bring Yemelya. The unwilling one at first forces them to dance using a wish, but then declares himself ready to visit the tsar's court. Followed by the soldiers, he drives through the country singing and making music on a hearth, and when he arrives at the court, with his entertainment he succeeds in making the princess dance and laugh. The Tsar, however, refuses to marry off his daughter to a peasant, therefore Yemelya and princess leave the court. The Tsar angrily orders his soldier to pursue Yemelya and bring him back to the court alive or dead. The attempt to catch up Emelya was unsuccessful.

The newly in-love couple manages to shake off the pursuers and settle in a distant place together with Yemelya's mother and honorable people. The magic fish bids goodbye to Yemelya.

Cast
 Pyotr Savin as Yemelya
 Maria Kravchunovskaya as Yemelya's mother
 Georgy Millyar as Tsar Gorokh
 Sofia Terenteva as Princess Who Never Smiled
 Lev Potyomkin as General One-Two
 Ivan Moskvin as deaf boyar
 Aleksandr Zhukov as Herald
 Andrei Fajt as Mohammed Aha
 Tatyana Strukova as nurse
 Lidiya Ryumina as nurse
 Vladimir Lepko as cook

References

External links
 (English subtitles)
 

1938 films
Russian children's fantasy films
Soviet fantasy films
Soviet fantasy comedy films
Films based on Russian folklore
Films based on Slavic mythology
Films directed by Aleksandr Rou
1930s children's fantasy films
1938 comedy films
Soviet black-and-white films
Russian black-and-white films
Films based on fairy tales
Soviet children's films